Lágrimas y gozos ("tears and joy") is the seventh studio album by the Spanish ska punk band Ska-P. It was released on 7 October 2008, entering the Spanish Top 100 Albums chart at number 6.

The first single from the CD, "Crimen sollicitationis", was released on 5 September 2008. Nicolas Sarkozy's voice is sampled in "La Colmena".
The sleeve notes include lyrics to the songs and, according to the sleeve notes, the lyrics are also available in both French and  English at Ska-P's official website.

Writing and production 
Lágrimas y gozos is the first album since Ska-P's break-up in 2002. The title of the album was a choice between Azufre ("sulphur") or Lágrimas y gozos ("tears and joy"). They explained their decision in choosing Lágrimas y gozos in an interview for the Spanish daily El Mundo:

Track listing

Personnel 
 Pulpul – vocals, guitar
 Luismi – drums
 Julio – bass
 Joxemi – guitar
 Kogote – keyboard
 Pipi – backing vocals
 Albert Pérez – trumpet
 Garikoitz Badiola – trombone, helicon
 Marc Sumo – tenor saxophone, baritone saxophone

Release history

Charts

Album

Singles

References

External links 
Ska-P's official website

Ska-P albums
2008 albums